List of Members of the 7th Lok Sabha, (18 January 1980 – 31 December 1984) elected December 1979 – January 1980. The Lok Sabha (House of the People) is the lower house in the Parliament of India nine sitting members from Rajya Sabha were elected to 7th Lok Sabha after the 1980 Indian general election. Indira Gandhi became the Prime minister on 14 January 1980, after INC and alliances won 373 seats, 286 seats more than previous 6th Lok Sabha. Rajiv Gandhi became Prime minister on 31 October 1984 after the assassination of Indira Gandhi. The next 8th Lok Sabha was formed on 31 December 1984 after the 1984 Indian general election. With roughly 9.3% of total MPs being Muslims, the 7th Lok Sabha had more Muslim MPs than any other in Indian history.

Speaker
Dr.Balram Jakhar =
22/1/1980 - 15/1/1985

Deputy Speaker
Shri G.Lakshmanan -
1/12/1980 - 31/12/1984

Secretary-General
Shri Avtar Singh Rikhy -
10-01-1980 - 31-12-1983
Dr. Subhash C. Kashyap -
31-12-1983 - 31-12-1984

List of members by political party

Members of the political party in the 7th Lok Sabha are given below:

Cabinet

References

External links

 7th Lok Sabha Members Official listings 
 Lok Sabha website

 Terms of the Lok Sabha
India MPs 1980–1984
1980 establishments in India
1984 disestablishments in India